Angel Santos Echevarria (May 25, 1971 – February 7, 2020) was an American professional baseball player who played outfield in the Major Leagues from 1996 to 2002. He also played in the Japanese Pacific League, from 2003 to 2004.

Amateur career 

Echevarria was a star baseball player at Bassick High School in Bridgeport, Connecticut, graduating in 1989. Over his junior and senior seasons, he managed a batting average of .500.

He accepted a partial scholarship to play college baseball for the Rutgers Scarlet Knights where he was an All-Atlantic 10 Conference selection. In 1990 he played collegiate summer baseball with the Orleans Cardinals of the Cape Cod Baseball League.

Echevarria was selected by the Colorado Rockies in the 17th round of the 1992 Major League Baseball draft.

Professional career
Echevarria was a replacement player during the 1994–95 Major League Baseball strike and played an exhibition game at Coors Field in front of 47,000 fans in the spring of 1995, more than a full year before his actual Major League debut.

Death 

Echevarria had been sick with a stomach virus for a number of days; he then fell and hit his head at his home. He died on February 7, 2020, at the age of 48.

References

External links

1971 births
2020 deaths
Acereros de Monclova players
American expatriate baseball players in Mexico
American expatriate baseball players in Japan
Baseball players from Connecticut
Bridgeport Bluefish players
Chicago Cubs players
Colorado Rockies players
Hokkaido Nippon-Ham Fighters players
Major League Baseball outfielders
Mexican League baseball first basemen
Mexican League baseball left fielders
Mexican League baseball right fielders
Milwaukee Brewers players
Nippon Ham Fighters players
Nippon Professional Baseball outfielders
Orleans Firebirds players
Rutgers Scarlet Knights baseball players
Sportspeople from Bridgeport, Connecticut
Accidental deaths from falls
Accidental deaths in Connecticut
Atenienses de Manatí (baseball) players
Bend Rockies players
Central Valley Rockies players
Colorado Springs Sky Sox players
Iowa Cubs players
New Haven Ravens players
Lobos de Arecibo players